Selenanthias myersi is a species of fish in the family Serranidae, a family that includes the sea basses, the groupers and fairy basslets. It is native to the tropical western and central Pacific Ocean.

Description

Distribution and habitat
Selenanthias myersi is known from three locations in the northwestern Pacific Ocean; two locations in the South China Sea and one in the Northern Mariana Islands.

Status
As a small, deep water reef species, Selenanthias myersi is not of interest to fisheries. No particular threats are known and it is likely that it occurs in a wider range of locations than is currently known. The International Union for Conservation of Nature has assessed its status as being of "least concern".

References

Anthiinae
Fish described in 1995